Sara de Sancto Aegidio (also known as Sara of St. Gilles; died after 1326) was a French physician.

Sara of Sancto Aegidio lived in Marseille, France. She was Jewish,  the daughter of Davin and the widow of a physician named Avraham. Her practice and medical knowledge is known through a contract with her student, Salvetus de Burgonoro of Salon de Provence, which is dated August 28, 1326.  The contract states that Sara de Sancto Aegidio was to instruct him in medicine for seven months, and also provide him with lodging and clothing.  In return, Sara de Sancto Aegidio's pupil was to give her any earnings that he might receive during his apprenticeship. This document is the earliest and best known example of this type of teacher-student contract.

References

Further reading

14th-century French physicians
14th-century French women
Medieval women physicians